Talabad or Tallabad may refer to:
 Tallabad, Isfahan
 Talabad, Kashmar